TIME Hotels Management is a UAE-based hotel management company founded in 2012. It is active across the Middle East and North Africa. It has seventeen properties across the United Arab Emirates, Qatar, Saudi Arabia, Morocco and Egypt.

Background
TIME Hotels has four divisions: TIME Hotels & Resorts, TIME Hotel Apartments, TIME Express Hotels, and TIME Residence Properties. Headquartered in Dubai, United Arab Emirates, TIME Hotels was founded in 2012 by international hoteliers and hospitality professionals. The group was led by Mohamed Awadalla. 

The group has since launched a diverse selection of destinations, including TIME Asma Hotel, the region's first female-run hotel, which opened to the public in 2021. The company initially launched six properties in Dubai and Sharjah, UAE, and is now expanding into Saudi Arabia, Qatar, Egypt, Morocco and Sudan.

History
TIME Hotel Group has four major brands: TIME Hotels and Resorts, TIME Hotel Apartments, TIME Express Hotels, and TIME Residence. 

 TIME ASMA Hotel, Dubai, UAE: 10th June 2021
TIME Grand Plaza Hotel, Dubai, UAE:   November 2010
TIME Onyx Hotel Apartments, Dubai, UAE:  Dec. 12, 2020
TIME Moonstone Hotel Apartments, Fujairah, UAE:  May 1,2022
TIME Ruby Hotel Apartments, Sharjah, UAE: 20th July, 2009
TIME Express Hotel, Sharjah, UAE: 20th January, 2020
TIME Dammam Residence, Dammam, Saudi Arabia: 21st March, 2019
TIME Muruj Hotel Aparmtens, Riyadh, Saudi Arabia:14th January,2022
TIME Oak Hotel & Suites, Dubai, UAE: 20th October, 2008
TIME Coral Nuweiba Resort, Sinai, Egypt: 1st January, 2022
TIME Rako Hotel, Doha, Qatar: 16th February, 2018

TIME Hotel and Resorts cater to both business and leisure travel and has six locations, including TIME Oak Hotel & Suites in Dubai, UAE; TIME Coral Nuweiba Resort in Egypt; TIME Grand Plaza Hotel at the Dubai Airport, UAE; TIME Asma Hotel in Dubai, UAE; and TIME Rako Hotel in Doha, Qatar.

TIME Hotel Apartments currently has five locations, including two hotel apartments in Sharjah, UAE, two in Saudi Arabia, and one in Dubai.

TIME Express Hotels Al Khan has fifty-five rooms in Sharjah, UAE and is a lower-cost hotel.

TIME Residence has five apartment properties, including Crown TIME Residence, Barsha Heights, Dubai, UAE; Sand TIME Residence, Sharjah, UAE; Platinum TIME Residence, Fujairah, UAE; Palm 1 & 2 TIME Residence, Ajman, UAE; and Al Sagr Plaza TIME Residence, UAE.

References

External links
Official website

Profiles
Facebook
Instagram
LinkedIn

Hotel chains in the United Arab Emirates
Hospitality companies established in 2012
Hotels in Dubai